The following list shows all people who have been Mayor of the Belgian, Flemish city of Torhout in chronological order.

Mayors of Torhout

References

 
Torhout